Carex idzuroei, also known as small-Dickin's sedge, is a tussock-forming species of perennial sedge in the family Cyperaceae. It is native to parts of China, Japan and Korea.

See also
List of Carex species

References

idzuroei
Taxa named by Adrien René Franchet
Taxa named by Ludovic Savatier
Plants described in 1878
Flora of Japan
Flora of Korea
Flora of China